Kang Joon-Woo  (born 3 June 1982) is a South Korean footballer who plays as defender. He played for FC Pocheon due to the military service and it would be ended at 11 Nov, 2013. Now he is playing for FC Anyang.

External links 
Jeju United official website 

1982 births
Living people
South Korean footballers
Korea National League players
K League 1 players
K League 2 players
K3 League players
Jeju United FC players
Association football defenders
Sportspeople from Jeju Province
Changwon City FC players
FC Anyang players